Amsacta fuscosa is a moth of the family Erebidae. It was described by Max Bartel in 1903. It is found in Ghana and Togo.

References

Moths described in 1903
Spilosomina
Insects of West Africa
Fauna of Togo
Moths of Africa